The Converse Memorial Library – also known as Converse Memorial Building – is a historically significant building designed by noted American architect H. H. Richardson. From 1885 to 1996, it housed the Malden Public Library, which now occupies a modern building adjacent to it. The former library is located at 36 Salem Street, Malden, Massachusetts.

The building was a gift of Elisha S. and Mary D. Converse in memory of their murdered son, Frank Eugene Converse, who was the victim of the first bank robbery/murder in North America. It was constructed 1883-1885 in an overall L-shape, with a facade of brown Longmeadow sandstone, a tower rising from the L's inner corner, and a heavily arched entry porch set within the L's short arm. The main library room is 50 x 36 feet and finished in elaborately carved white oak with a high, vaulted ceiling. Its furniture was designed by Richardson and manufactured by the Boston firm of A. H. Davenport and Company.

In 1896 two additions were made to the building, designed by Richardson's successor firm, Shepley, Rutan & Coolidge.  One gable-roofed wing extends the building to the rear, along Park Street, following the same general lines of the existing structure.  The other addition was a flat-roofed rectangular stack area also attached to the rear.  An octagonal gallery space further extended the rear in 1916, designed by Newhall & Blevins.

The Converse Memorial Building was the last of Richardson's library designs, and is generally considered among his finest works. It was designated a National Historic Landmark in 1987.

In Popular Culture 
The interior of the library's historic wing provided the setting for a scene in the movie Ted 2, starring Mark Wahlberg and Amanda Seyfried.

See also
National Register of Historic Places listings in Middlesex County, Massachusetts
List of National Historic Landmarks in Massachusetts

References

Gallery

External links
 Jeffrey Karl Ochsner, H. H. Richardson: Complete Architectural Works, MIT Press, 1985, page 314. .
 American Library Association, Annual Conference Proceedings of the American Library Association,  1889, pages 78–79.
 National Historic Landmarks entry
 Digital Archive of American Architecture
 Filming ‘Ted 2’ at Malden Public Library

Library buildings completed in 1885
Richardsonian Romanesque architecture in Massachusetts
Henry Hobson Richardson buildings
National Historic Landmarks in Massachusetts
Libraries on the National Register of Historic Places in Massachusetts
Libraries in Middlesex County, Massachusetts
Public libraries in Massachusetts
Education in Malden, Massachusetts
National Register of Historic Places in Middlesex County, Massachusetts
Buildings and structures in Malden, Massachusetts